Ann-Katrin Müller (born 1987) is a German journalist, and the political editor of Der Spiegel. She received an AxelSpringer Prize in Silver in 2018.

Early life and education 
Müller was born in 1987, in the Rhineland, Germany. She studied political science and European studies in Bonn and London.

Career 
Her career started as an intern at the ARD talkshow Hart aber Fair (English: Hard But Fair). Later, Müller worked for public television stations Phoenix, DAPD News Agency, Financial Times Deutschland and public broadcaster WDR Fernsehen.

Since 2013, Müller has been the political editor at the Berlin office of Der Spiegel. She is a researcher on the right-wing Alternative for Germany (AfD) party and political disinformation. In addition, she is an expert on sexual violence, and has done extensive research on the topic, also in the context of elite sports.

In 2018, Müller was awarded the Silver Axel-Springer-Prize for her report on two men recalling their stories of being placed under the care of pedophiles while in the Berlin foster care system. The jury, including Moritz Müller-Wirth of Die Zeit, praised Ann-Katrin Müller for the sensitivity and "sober clarity" (nüchterne Klarheit) with which she covered the scandal.

References

External links

1987 births
Living people
21st-century German women writers
21st-century German journalists
German women journalists
German newspaper editors
University of Bonn alumni
Women newspaper editors
German women editors
German political journalists
Writers from Rhineland-Palatinate